Maayka - Saath Zindagi Bhar Ka is an Indian television series that was aired  on Zee TV from 15 January 2007 until 13 August 2009. . The series was originally produced by Anjana Sood's production house, Classic Productions, but was taken over by Dheeraj Kumar's, Creative Eye Limited due to high overhead costs and delays. Once taken over, Creative Eye replaced almost the entire cast of Maayka by ending their scene with a bomb explosion; the cast members filed a case against the channel with Cine and TV Artistes Association (CINTAA) for blacklisting them.

Plot
The story concerns the Malhotra family's three daughters - Raji, Soni and Mahi and their younger brother Prince. Initially, the show focuses on the eldest daughter, Raji, who marries a police officer Veer and tries hard to adjust to the lifestyle of his family. Mahi falls in love with Veer's brother Jeet but he actually loves Soni though he confuses the two sisters. Mahi is so heartbroken that she tries to commit suicide.

Veer and Jeet's mother Durga Khurana, calls Mr. Sareen (her sister's husband) to create problems for the Malhotra family. Mahi becomes a model and Sareen's son, Shabd falls in love with her, in order to save her family from Mr. Sareen, Mahi marries Shabd, then a bomb explodes at the Malhotras' house, killing Raji and most of her family. The only survivors are Soni and Mahi.

After their maayka (parental home) is destroyed, the girls struggle for survival, Soni, through a twist of fate, marries her sister's former husband, Veer, when Shabd finds out that Mahi is not as successful as he had thought, he feels cheated and begins to hate his new wife, Shabd's uncle and aunt help repair his marriage to Mahi. Mahi finds out that Shabd's sister, Kamya behaves oddly because she witnessed her father burn her mother alive because her mother had supported Kamya's love affair. Mahi exposes Mr. Sareen and takes care of a distraught Shabd.

Shabd realises Mahi's value, Jeet marries Cherry since he thinks Soni betrayed him, when Cherry discovers Soni and Jeet's past, she begins to plot killing Soni, Cherry's plan instead ends with Veer's death, Soni is left a pregnant widow, later, Jeet and Soni marry though Soni miscarries. Mohini (Soni and Mahi's mother) is found alive and she goes to live with Mahi at her house.

Misunderstandings arise between the two sisters when Mohini leaves Mahi's home without telling anyone, Mahi gives birth to two daughters, giving one baby to Soni as Soni cannot conceive. But after sometime, under pressure from Shabd's family, she asks for her daughter back.

Cast
 Urmila Kanitkar as Raji Malhotra/Raji Veer Khurana - The eldest Malhotra sister, Veer's first wife (2007)
 Neha Bamb as Mahi Malhotra/Mahi Shabd Sareen - Raji and Soni's youngest sister, Shabd's wife (2007-2009)
 Arti Singh (2007)/ Shilpa Shinde (2007-2009)/ Kanchi Kaul (2009) as Soni Malhotra/ Soni Veer Khurana/ Soni Jeet Khurana - Raji and Mahi's sister, Veer's second wife after Raji's death, Jeet's second wife after Veer's death
 Vineet Raina as Veer Khurana - Jeet's elder brother, Raji's husband before her death, Soni's first husband (2007-2008)
 Vivan Bhatena as Shabd Sareen - Yashwant's son, Kamya's brother, Mahi's husband (2007-2009)
 Vikrant Rai (2007)/ Romit Raj (2007-2009) as Jeet Khurana - Veer's younger brother, Cherry's husband, Soni's second husband after Veer's death
 Sudhir Pandey as Brij Malhotra - Mahotra sisters' father (2007)
 Nandita Puri (2007) / Zarina Wahab (2008–2009) as Mohini Malhotra - Malhotra sisters' long lost mother 
 Pankaj Berry(2007)/ Naresh Suri (2007-2009) as Mr. Khurana - Durga's husband, Veer, Jeet, Jyoti and Veena's father
 Aruna Irani (2007) / Shoma Anand (2007-2009) as Durga Khurana - Khurana's wife, Veer, Jeet, Jyoti and Veena's mother
 Nisha Sareen as Kamya Sareen - Yashwant's daughter, Shabd's sister (2007-2009)
 Pawan Chopra as Yashwant Sareen - Shabd and Kamya's father (2007)
 Damini Anand as Charanjeet (Cherry) - Jeet's first wife (2007-2009)
 Juhi Singh as Veena Khurana - Veer, Jeet and Jyoti's sister (2007)
 Karuna Verma as Jyoti Khurana - Veer, Jeet and Veena's sister (2007-2009)
 Gurpreet Singh as Parmeet - Jyoti's husband (2008)
 Amrapali Dubey as Tina (2009)
 Upasana Singh as Lovely (2007-2009)
 Sushil Parashar as Taayaa Ji (2007-2009)
 Jayati Bhatia as Billo Taaee Ji (2007-2009)
 Parmeet Sethi as Prem (2007)
 Jasveer Kaur as Suhani (2007-2008)
  Shriya Bisht as Sapna (2008-2009)
 Raju Kher as Harry Mama - Cherry's uncle (2007-2008)
 Indraneil Sengupta as Angad (2008-2009)
 Kunal Karan Kapoor as Sukhi (2009)
 Arun Bali as Daarji (2009)
 Micckie Dudaaney as Aditya Dhanraj (2009)
 Savita Bajaj as Bua (2008-2009)
 Janvi Chheda as Simran (2009)

References

External links
 Official Site
 

2007 Indian television series debuts
2009 Indian television series endings
Indian television soap operas
Zee TV original programming
Television shows set in Delhi